Hossein Marashi (born 17 November 1958 in Rafsanjan) is an Iranian politician. He served as the Iranian Vice President for Cultural Heritage and Tourism from 2003 to 2005. Prior to that, Marashi represented Kerman in the Iranian parliament. He strongly backed opposition candidate Mousavi in the 2009 Iranian election. Marashi is also reportedly a close ally of Akbar Hashemi Rafsanjani, another former president. He has been secretary general of the Executives of Construction Party. He has been named the head of vice-president Eshaq Jahangiri's campaign.

He was the head of the province of Kerman for nearly nine years. He founded a Kerman-based charity by the name of Mol-Al-Movahedin Charity (or Non-Profit) Institute, which owns Mahan Air, an Iranian private airline. In 2011, the charity was involved in a scandal when it was accused of buying airplanes on behalf of Mahan Air. The airline had been facing sanctions by the United States Department of the Treasury for allegedly transporting weapons and advisors to troubled areas such as Syria and Yemen. The claim that firm had any connection with these political actives was denied by members of its board, and Marashi himself.

As the head of the Cultural Heritage Organization of Iran, Marashi increased the budget of the organization. However, some of Marashi's opponents believe that he was responsible for the disappearance of invaluable historical pieces, and the destruction of historical buildings. These opponents claim that despite public pressure, he never took any action to stop the destruction of historical artifacts. Marashi supported the construction of the controversial Sivand Dam in the territory of Pasargadae. The dam was constructed in proximity to the ancient city, and experts believe that if the dam burst, it could destroy several UNESCO World Heritage Sites.

On March 19, 2010 it was announced that Marashi had been jailed in Iran, when a court of appeals upheld his one-year prison term. He was released from prison earlier than that, on January 25, 2011.

Marashi is a cousin of former president Rafsanjani's wife, Effat Marashi.

References

External links 
 
http://www.bbc.co.uk/persian/iran/story/2005/09/050902_ra-jb-iran-pasargad.shtml

1958 births
Heads of Cultural Heritage, Handicrafts and Tourism Organization
Living people
Executives of Construction Party politicians
Members of the Reformists' Supreme Council for Policymaking
Members of the 5th Islamic Consultative Assembly
Members of the 6th Islamic Consultative Assembly
People from Kerman Province
Iranian campaign managers